Fürstenfeldbruck Air Base (German: "Fliegerhorst Fürstenfeldbruck" or "Flugplatz Fürstenfeldbruck") is a former German Air Force airfield near the town of Fürstenfeldbruck in Bavaria, near Munich, Germany.

Fürstenfeldbruck became famous first as the main training base for the German Luftwaffe during World War II, then as the site of the Munich massacre of nine Israeli athletes and coaches (two were killed earlier) and one German police officer at the 1972 Summer Olympics. Military flight operations ceased in 2003, a small civil flight operation ended in 2015. The adjacent barracks are still used by the German Air Force Officer Training School, which is to be relocated to Roth. In the eastern part of the former air base, the BMW Driving Academy Maisach was established.

Units 
Since 1957, Fürstenfeldbruck has been the home of the German Air Force Officer Training School. Various aircraft (G-91, Alpha Jet, T-33, Tornado) operated from the base until 1997 when all flying was halted.

Today, Fürstenfeldbruck hosts the following units:

 HQ 1. Air Force Division
 Officer school of the Air Force,
 Photo Intelligence School
 Aeromedical Institute of the Air Force,
 School for Military Geophysics
 IT-Sector 1
 Military Driving School
 Military Medical Center
 Military Training Aid Office
 Base Administration Office

History 
The Air Base was established in 1935, and was the Luftkriegsschule 4 (LKS 4—4th Air War School) of the Luftwaffe during World War II. Field Marshal Hermann Göring is said to have taken a deep personal interest in establishing an air force training base for the Luftwaffe and modeled Fürstenfeldbruck after the United States Army Air Forces training center at Randolph Field, Texas.

The RAF and USAAF understood that Fürstenfeldbruck was being used extensively as a training base, and believed it to be of little strategic importance. Consequently, it escaped bombing until the later stages of the war, and then it was attacked severely.

Allied bombing began to desolate many German cities in 1944 and in October the Luftwaffe leaders rushed work to extend the air base's runways long enough for fighter aircraft takeoffs. Thousand of slave laborers are said to have "expedited" this project and as the war neared its final critical stages the Luftwaffe was able to mount fighters from the base. That, however, provoked the Allies to make the only serious bombing raid on the field.

Fifty direct hits were made on the field the afternoon of 9 April 1945 when 338 B-17s of the 1st Air Division, Eighth Air Force, unleashed 867 tons of bombs on the runways, hangars, repair shops, and other facilities.

USAF use 
When the Allied Forces moved in to take possession of the field in late April, they found that Prisoners of War and townspeople had looted until they left a deserted installation. Fürstenfeldbruck was occupied by American forces and was at first was the home of a US Army engineering battalion. After some reconstruction, Fürstenfeldbruck became the Headquarters, UAAF/ET Replacement Depot (Provisional) in November 1945. Tens of thousands of fresh Army Air Force replacement troops from the Zone of the Interior (ZI), as the USA was referred to, arrived in trains from Le Havre and were housed in stone barracks for a week or so before being assigned to their final airbase or other destination, where they replaced veteran airmen who were redeployed home for discharge, also through the Replacement Depot.  The offices and base personnel housing were excellent and included a fully equipped theater, natatorium (indoor swimming pool), mess hall, and 4-man bedrooms, each with its own bathroom, all housed in stone buildings rather than wooden barracks or tents.

Several other USAAF units performed occupation duty at Fürstenfeldbruck:

 70th Fighter Wing (28 July - 9 November 1945)
 306th Bombardment Group (16 August - 13 September 1946)  Assigned to the 128th Replacement Battalion, AAF/ET Replacement Depot.
 45th Reconnaissance Group (April - June 1947)

The 306th Bomb Group engaged in special photographic mapping duty in western Europe and North Africa. Its 34th Reconnaissance Squadron flew these missions with B-17s. This assignment was continued by the 160th Photographic Reconnaissance squadron of the 10th Recon Group flying F-5 (P-38) and F-6 (P-51) aircraft.

During First Berlin Crisis, B-29-equipped 301st Bombardment Group was stationed at Fürstenfeldbruck for a short period in July/August 1948.

The Replacement Depot functioned until August 1948, when USAFE decided to use Fürstenfeldbruck as an operational jet base.

36th Fighter-Bomber Wing 

On 13 August 1948 the 36th Fighter Wing was assigned to Fürstenfeldbruck Air Base as an operational unit. The unit was transferred to Germany from Howard Air Force Base, Canal Zone. When the wing arrived in Germany, it became the first USAFE unit to be jet-equipped with the Lockheed F-80A/B "Shooting Star".

Active squadrons of the 36th FW were:

 22d Fighter (F-80A/B, Red color band)
 23d Fighter (F-80A/B, Blue color band)
 53d Fighter (F-80A/B, Green color band)

Markings of the squadrons consisted of a color band under the fin, and a long lightning flash with an arrowhead tip on its forward end, extending back from the nose to the center of the fuselage.

In May 1949, HQ USAFE authorized the 36th Fighter Group to form the "" aerial demo team to perform at European and Mediterranean area air shows. The new USAFE Skyblazers team from Fürstenfeldbruck AB made its first-ever performance in October 1949 at RAF Gütersloh in the British zone of then-occupied Germany.

On 20 January 1950, the 36th FW was redesignated as a Fighter-Bomber Wing (FBW) when 89 Republic F-84E "Thunderjets" arrived. The F-80s were sent back to CONUS to equip Air National Guard units.

The squadrons retained the same color designations with their F-84s, however the F-84 markings consisted of a solid geometric shape painted on the vertical stabilizer, just above the radio call number, with a capital letter specific to each aircraft at the center. Eventually these markings gave way to medium blue/white striping angled about 15 degrees up on the vertical stabilizer surfaces, with squadron colors being painted on them.

The 36th FBW remained at Fürstenfeldbruck until 1952 when it was reassigned to Bitburg Air Base, west of the Rhine.

117th Tactical Reconnaissance Wing 

On 27 January 1952 the activated Air National Guard 117th Tactical Reconnaissance Wing deployed to Europe as was assigned to Toul-Rosieres Air Base, France. In 1952, Toul Air Base was unfinished at the time of the wings activation/deployment and not yet ready for jet aircraft. This meant only the Wing HQ was in France, and the two attached RF-80A squadrons were moved to Germany. The 160th to Neubiberg Air Base; the 112th and 157th to Fürstenfeldbruck.

The mission of the 1117th TRW was to provide tactical, visual, photographic and electronic reconnaissance by both day and night, as was required by the military forces within the European command. The RF-80's were responsible for the daylight operations, and the RB-25s for night reconnaissance.

The Wing's complement of aircraft was 15 RB-26Cs and 14 RF-80As, assigned as follows:

 112th Tactical Reconnaissance (RB-26C, Yellow stripes on tail)
 157th Tactical Reconnaissance (RF-80A, Red stripes on tail)

In addition, each squadron had a T-33A trainer assigned to it.

On 9 July 1952 the activated Air National Guard 117th TRW was released from active duty.

10th Tactical Reconnaissance Wing 

On 9 July 1952 the 10th Tactical Reconnaissance Wing was activated in Europe, being reassigned from Pope Army Air Field, North Carolina. The squadrons of the 117th TRW were redesignated as follows:

 1st Tactical Reconnaissance (RB-26C) (Formerly 112th TRS)
 38th Tactical Reconnaissance (RF-80A) (Formerly 157th TRS)

The 10th Tactical Reconnaissance Wing was designated as the successor of the World War II 10th Reconnaissance Group, being awarded its lineage and honors. The 10th RG was previously stationed at Fürstenfeldbruck in 1947.

With the re-designation of the 117th TRW, it was found that runway conditions at Toul Air Base were still considered to be unsatisfactory for safe operations of jet aircraft, however the base in France was completed enough for the operation of propeller aircraft. Therefore, the RF-80 equipped 32nd TRS remained at Fürstenfeldbruck in a deployed status, while the propeller-driven RB-26's of the 1st TRS were reassigned to Toul.

The 32nd TRS' RF-80s were repainted with red lightning bolts were painted on their vertical stabilizers, and blue lightning flashes were painted on the center fuselage and wing tip tanks.

The 32nd TRS remained at Fürstenfeldbruck until 9 May 1953 when the 10 TRW was reassigned to Spangdahlem Air Base in Germany as part of a USAFE reorganization.

7330th Flying Training Wing 
In November 1953, the 7330th Flying Training Wing was activated at Fürstenfeldbruck. The mission of the Wing was to provide upgrading and instructor training for students of MAP (Mutual Assistance Pact) – recipient countries in T-33 trainers; to operate and maintain Fürstenfeldbruck Air Base; provide administrative and logistical support for tenant units; prepare for the reception and provide necessary support for tactical units using Fürstenfeldbruck as a staging base; and to operate and maintain the Siegenburg gunnery range.

In 1955 the French, British and American occupation of Germany ended and permission was given to the West German government to re-establish its armed forces. In 1957 Fürstenfeldbruck Air Base became a joint-use facility with the new West German Air Force.

Joint-use continued until 1958 with the 7330th wing, then the organization was redesigned as the 7367th Flying Training Group until it was discontinued in 1960.

1972 Munich Olympics 
During the 1972 Summer Olympics Munich International Airport was restricted for a short time for security reasons. Some civilian commercial tourist flights came into Fürstenfeldbruck instead during the Olympics. There was an extraordinarily heavy army presence on the base, with armoured vehicles escorting aircraft on landing and automatic weapons in common sight in the Terminal, something unheard of at this time. A military brass band was playing in the terminal to calm tourists' nerves at the sight of this extraordinary security.

The "Munich Massacre" 

On September 5, 1972, eight Palestinian terrorists from the group Black September took eleven members of the Israeli Olympic team hostage. Two hostages were murdered in one of the Israeli apartments in the Olympic Village. After lengthy negotiations with Olympic and government officials, the Palestinians demanded transport to Cairo via Munich-Riem Airport, but negotiators convinced them to take their nine surviving hostages to the Fürstenfeldbruck Air Base instead. The eight terrorists and their nine remaining Israeli hostages were transported in two helicopters from the Olympic Village to Fürstenfeldbruck, where a Boeing 727 was waiting. Five German police snipers, with no specialist terrorist training, proceeded to engage the Palestinians in an attempt to free the hostages. In the ensuing gun battle on the tarmac all nine Israeli hostages and one German police officer were killed. All of the hostages were killed while they were still tied up in the helicopters. Since the massacre, there has been much criticism levelled at the German authorities for the way they planned and executed the rescue attempt.
The year after the event, in response to the hostage crisis, West German government founded GSG9 a counter-terrorism and special operations unit of the German Federal Police.

References 

 Endicott, Judy G. (1999) Active Air Force wings as of 1 October 1995; USAF active flying, space, and missile squadrons as of 1 October 1995. Maxwell AFB, Alabama: Office of Air Force History. CD-ROM.
 Maurer, Maurer (1983). Air Force Combat Units Of World War II. Maxwell AFB, Alabama: Office of Air Force History. .
 Ravenstein, Charles A. (1984). Air Force Combat Wings Lineage and Honors Histories 1947–1977. Maxwell AFB, Alabama: Office of Air Force History. .
 USAAS-USAAC-USAAF-USAF Aircraft Serial Numbers—1908 to Present

External links 

 Fürstenfeldbruck Air Base
 Offizierschule der Luftwaffe Officer School Of the German Air Force (In German)
 Fursty Tree Movers Website
 BMW and Mini Driving Academy Maisach

Luftwaffe bases
Installations of the United States Air Force in Germany
Bases of the German Air Force
Buildings and structures in Fürstenfeldbruck (district)
Airports in Bavaria
Defunct airports in Germany
Training establishments of the Luftwaffe